Julia DeVillers  is an American writer of books including How My Private, Personal Journal Became A Bestseller. She had a cameo in the 2006 Disney Channel Original Movie, Read It and Weep, which was based on the book.

Life 
DeVillers attended Colonie High School in Albany, New York. She studied Communications at the State University of New York, Oswego and obtained an MA in Journalism from Ohio State University. Her twin sister, Jennifer Roy, six minutes older, is also a writer.

DeVillers lives in New Albany, Ohio, with her husband and two children. She lived overseas for a year in Tbilisi, Georgia, while her husband worked in the US Embassy.

Bibliography

Fiction
 UltraSquad graphic novel series illustrated by Rafael Rosado (Justice Studios)
 The Maddie Ziegler series with Maddie Ziegler (Simon and Schuster)
Co-written with Jennifer Roy: Trading Faces, Take Two, Times Squared and Double Feature (Simon & Schuster)
 Liberty Porter, First Daughter series about a 9-year-old girl whose father is elected president and moves into the White House. (Simon and Schuster).
How My Private Personal Journal Became a Bestseller (E. P. Dutton).
Emma Emmets, Playground Matchmaker (Razorbill).
Lynnvisible (E. P. Dutton).
Princess of Gossip, co-written Sabrina Bryan. (Simon and Schuster MTV books).
Tuned In.

Nonfiction
GirlWise: How To Be Confident, Capable, Cool and in Control (Random House).
The College Dorm Survival Guide (Random House).

References

External links
 
 Julia DeVillers at publisher Simon & Schuster
 Julia DeVillers at publisher Random House
 Princess of Gossip (official)
 Trading Faces (official)
 

American children's writers
State University of New York at Oswego alumni
Writers from Ohio
People from New Albany, Ohio
Living people
American twins
Place of birth missing (living people)
American women children's writers
Year of birth missing (living people)
21st-century American women